Attorney General Frelinghuysen may refer to:

Frederick Theodore Frelinghuysen (1817–1885), Attorney General of New Jersey
Theodore Frelinghuysen (1787–1862), Attorney General of New Jersey